The 2006 United States Senate election in Montana was held November 7, 2006. The filing deadline was March 23; the primary was held June 6. Incumbent Republican Senator Conrad Burns ran for re-election to a fourth term, but lost to Democrat Jon Tester by a margin of 0.87%, or 3,562 votes out of 406,505 cast. This made the election the second-closest race of the 2006 Senate election cycle, behind only the election in Virginia.

Background 
Burns was first elected as a United States Senator from Montana in 1988, when he defeated Democratic incumbent John Melcher in a close race, 52% to 48%. Burns was re-elected 62.4% to 37.6%, over Jack Mudd in the Republican Revolution year of 1994. In 2000, Burns faced the well-financed Brian Schweitzer whom he beat 50.6% to 47.2%.

In 2000, George W. Bush carried Montana 58% to 33% in the race for President, but Burns won by 3.4%. Since the direct election of Senators began in 1913, Burns is only the second Republican Montana has elected to the U.S. Senate. Also, for thirty-two straight years, 1952 to 1984, Montana elected only Democratic Senators.

Burns' involvement in the Jack Abramoff scandal made him vulnerable. A SurveyUSA poll released in March 2006 found that 38% of Montanans approved of him, while 52% disapproved of him. Polls against leading Democratic candidates had him below his challengers.

Democratic primary

Candidates 
 Jon Tester, President of the Montana State Senate
 John Morrison, Montana State Auditor
 Paul Richards, Montana State Representative
 Robert Candee, farmer
 Ken Marcure, activist

Campaign 
On May 31, 2006, Richards, citing the closeness of the race, and his own position (third) in the polls, withdrew from the race, and threw his support to Tester. Morrison started off strong in the race for the Democratic nomination for Senator, collecting $1.05 million as of the start of 2006, including $409,241 in the last three months of 2005. but Morrison’s advantages in fundraising and name identification did not translate into a lead in the polls. Later, the race was called a "deadlock," but Tester continued to gather momentum.

Results

Republican primary

Candidates 
 Conrad Burns, incumbent U.S. Senator
 Bob Keenan, Montana State Senator
 Bob Kelleher, perennial candidate
 Daniel Lloyd Neste Huffman, businessman

Results

General election

Candidates 
 Conrad Burns (R), incumbent U.S. Senator
 Stan Jones (L), activist
 Jon Tester (D), State Senator

Campaign 
The race was expected to be close, due to Burns' narrow margin of victory in 2000, when he significantly underperformed Republican presidential nominee George W. Bush, and political scandal that he had been involved in. Republican incumbents everywhere were facing more challenging races in 2006 due to the waning popularity of the Republican-controlled Congress and the administration of President George W. Bush. In July 2006, the Rasmussen report viewed Burns as the "second most vulnerable Senator seeking re-election this year", after Pennsylvania’s Rick Santorum.

Senator Conrad Burns of Montana faced a strong challenge from Brian Schweitzer in 2000, being re-elected by 3.4% in a state that went for Bush twice by margins of over 20%. This, combined with the increasing strength of the state Democratic party and accusations of ethical issues related to the Jack Abramoff scandal, made this a highly competitive race.

On July 27, Burns was forced to apologize after he confronted out of state firefighters who were preparing to leave Montana after helping contain a summer forest fire and directly questioned their competence and skill, remarks for which he was strongly criticized.

On August 31, in a letter faxed to the office of Montana governor Brian Schweitzer, Burns urged the governor, a Democrat, to declare a fire state of emergency and activate the Montana Army National Guard for firefighting. Schweitzer had already declared such a state of emergency on July 11 — thus, activating the Montana Army National Guard. He issued a second declaration on August 11. A Burns spokesman said the senator was "pretty sure" Schweitzer had already issued such a disaster declaration, but just wanted to make sure. "The genesis of the letter was just to make sure that all the bases were covered," Pendleton said. "This is not a political football. It’s just a cover-the-bases letter and certainly casts no aspersions on the governor."

Debates
Complete video of debate, June 25, 2006 - C-SPAN
Complete video of debate, September 10, 2006 - C-SPAN
Complete video of debate, September 23, 2006 - C-SPAN
Complete video of debate, October 9, 2006 - C-SPAN
Complete video of debate, October 12, 2006 - C-SPAN
Complete video of debate, October 20, 2006 - C-SPAN

Predictions

Polling

Results 

Tester narrowly defeated Burns on election day by just over 3,000 votes. Libertarian candidate Jones received over 10,000 votes, greater than Tester's margin of victory. 

Due to errors with polling machines, the Montana count was delayed well into Wednesday, November 8. The race was too close to call throughout the night and many pundits predicted the need for a recount. After a very close election, on November 9, incumbent Conrad Burns conceded defeat.

Just before 11:00 AM (MST) on November 8, Jon Tester was declared Senator-elect for Montana in USA Today. At 2:27 PM EST on November 8, CNN projected that Jon Tester would win the race.

Under Montana law, if the margin of defeat is more than 0.25% but less than 0.5%, the losing candidate can request a recount if they pay for it themselves. However, this election did not qualify for a recount because the margin was larger than 0.5%. Burns conceded the race on November 9, and congratulated Tester on his victory.

The race was the closest Senate election of 2006 in terms of absolute vote difference; the closest race by percentage difference was the Virginia Senate election.

Statewide results

County results

Source

See also 
 2006 United States Senate elections

References

External links 
Official campaign websites (Archived)
 Jon Tester (D)
 Conrad Burns (R)
 "Montana Senator in Fight of Political Life," Associated Press, October 15, 2006
  Robert 'Bob' Candee's official campaign site 
 Stan Jones' official campaign site
 Bob Keenan's official campaign site
 John Morrison's official campaign site
 Paul Richards' official campaign site
 Democratic Senatorial Campaign Committee page on this election

Montana
2006
2006 Montana elections